Antonio Martínez may refer to:

Arts and Entertainment
 Antonio Martínez de Meneses (c. 1612–1661), playwright of the Spanish Golden Age
 Antonio Martínez Sarrión (born 1939), poet and translator
 Antonio Alonso Martinez (born 1963), Spanish/Portuguese painter

Politics
 Antonio José Martínez (1793–1867), New Mexican priest, educator and politician
 Antonio María Martínez (died 1823), governor of Spanish Texas
 Antonio Martínez Luna, Attorney General of the Mexican state of Baja California

Sports
 Antonio Martínez (basketball) (born 1926), Filipino former basketball player
 Antonio Martínez (footballer, born 1977), Mexican football midfielder
 Antonio Martínez (footballer, born 1990), Spanish football midfielder
 Toni Martínez (born 1997), Spanish football forward